Lev HaMifratz Mall (Kanyon Lev HaMifratz, lit. Heart of the Bay Mall), officially branded Cinemall, is a shopping mall located in Haifa, Israel.

Lev HaMifratz has three floors of stores, a food court, an underground parking garage, and an above ground parking garage. In the past, it included an amusement park, a miniature golf course and an ice skating rink.

The area around Lev HaMifratz is also a transportation hub. Behind it is a train station, with trains to Nahariya and Tel Aviv. The entrance to the station is from the above ground parking garage. It is also adjacent to the Haifa Bay Central Bus Station, which is the main junction between the Krayot and the city of Haifa.

During construction, the mall was hit by an Iraqi Scud missile in the course of the 1991 Gulf War.

Attempted bombing
In 2003, terrorists attempted to bomb the mall. The terror attack was thwarted when police sappers disarmed a bomb weighing dozens of kilograms in a car outside the mall Saturday night. Israeli police suspect Hezbollah or another organization with links to Iran was behind the attempted bombing.

See also
 List of shopping malls in Israel

References

1991 establishments in Israel
Shopping malls established in 1991
Buildings and structures in Haifa
Mall
Shopping malls in Israel
Tourist attractions in Haifa